opened on a new site in Tsu, Mie Prefecture, Japan, in 2014. Also known as MieMu, it replaced the former  which opened in 1953 and closed in 2014.

See also
 List of Historic Sites of Japan (Mie)
 List of Cultural Properties of Japan - historical materials (Mie)
 Mie Prefectural Art Museum

References

External links

  Mie Prefectural Museum

Museums in Mie Prefecture
Prefectural museums
Museums established in 1953
1953 establishments in Japan
Museums established in 2014
2014 establishments in Japan
Tsu, Mie